Obervogelgesang is a station on the Dresden to Děčín line that serves , a district of the town of Pirna in the German state of Saxony. 

The station is served by the Dresden S-Bahn S1 service. Trains run to Pirna, Dresden and Meißen in one direction, and to Bad Schandau and Schöna in the other direction. The service provides two trains per hour in both directions for most of each day.

References

Railway stations in Saxony
Dresden S-Bahn stations